Tanin (Turkish: "resonance") was a Turkish newspaper. It was founded in 1908 after the Young Turk Revolution, by Tevfik Fikret, the Ottoman poet who is considered the founder of the modern school of Turkish poetry. It became a strong supporter of the new progressive ruling party, the Committee of Union and Progress (CUP), and pluralism and diversity were reflected on the pages of Tanin.

During this time, the Tanin's editor, Hüseyin Cahid, escaped to Odessa.

It was published until 1947. Although Tevfik Fikret was initially supportive of the CUP democratic reforms, he was later disappointed by its leadership's policies and resigned his position in the Tanin.

Notable journalists
 Hüseyin Cahid Yalçin
 Ahmet Emin Yalman

References

1908 establishments in the Ottoman Empire
1947 disestablishments in Turkey
Defunct newspapers published in the Ottoman Empire
Defunct newspapers published in Turkey
Newspapers established in 1908
Newspapers published in Istanbul
Publications disestablished in 1947
Turkish-language newspapers